AMeDAS (Automated Meteorological Data Acquisition System), commonly known in Japanese as "アメダス" (amedasu), is a high-resolution surface observation network developed by the Japan Meteorological Agency (JMA) used for gathering regional weather data and verifying forecast performance.

Observations at manned stations cover weather, wind direction and speed, types and amounts of precipitation, types and base heights of clouds, visibility, air temperature, humidity, sunshine duration, and atmospheric pressure. All of these (except weather, visibility and cloud-related meteorological elements) are observed automatically.

At unmanned stations, observations are performed every 10 minutes. About 700 of the unmanned stations observe precipitation, air temperature, wind direction and speed, and sunshine duration, while the other stations observe only precipitation.

For about 280 stations (manned or unmanned) located in areas of heavy snowfall, snow depth is also observed.

All the observational data is transmitted to the AMeDAS Center at JMA Headquarters in Tokyo on a real time basis via dedicated telephone lines. The data is then delivered to the whole country after a quality check.

As well as weather conditions, AMeDAS is also used in the observation of natural disasters. Temporary observation points are set up in areas where there are signs of volcanic eruptions or earthquakes.

See also 
 Mesonet

External links 
 Japan Meteorological Agency observations descriptions

Geography of Japan
Japan Meteorological Agency
Meteorological data and networks
Meteorological instrumentation and equipment
Science and technology in Japan